is an action game developed by Media.Vision and published by Square Enix for the PlayStation 2 console. It was released in Japan exclusively. Production companies Satelight and How Full's participated in the creation of the game.

Gameplay 
The game pits futuristic robots against one another in wrestling matches. The player controls a robot during battles using a four-icon menu. Three actions—strike, guard and grapple—can be executed at any time and augments the player's "beat meter". The fourth action, called "beat attack", can be performed once the beat meter is filled and inflicts special damage according to how hard the button is pressed. Icons sometime shake to indicate that they are recommended, but the player must react quickly as each turn is timed. A rock-paper-scissors set of rules determined the winner of each pair of actions.

Anime cutscenes and fictional sponsor information are displayed before the start of each match. The player's robot can be customized to alter its appearance.

Plot 
The game is set in a fictional Japan in the year 2980, in which competitive fights between radio-controlled robots has become a popular sport called "Robot-ress". The player takes on the role of Denki Akihabara, a high-school student whose family runs a butcher shop. Denki decides to become a Robot-ress master after learning about Heavy Metal Thunder, the world's strongest robot. At the beginning of the game, he receives a robot and an invitation to the Titan Fight tournament from his father, who is actually the world champion and owner of Heavy Metal Thunder. The Titan Fight is a competition in which losing robots are destroyed and their owners buried on Death Island. The plot spans roughly thirty years in total, with Denki over forty years old at the end of the game.

Development 
Heavy Metal Thunder was announced at a special event held by Square Enix in Shibuya, Tokyo on March 2, 2005, with the presence of Japanese band Sex Machineguns. It is loosely adapted from Heavy Meta-san, a metal/hard rock show broadcast on TV Tokyo, hosted by gravure idol Yoko Kumada and sponsored by Square Enix. The characters of the game were designed by Harold Sakuishi, creator of the Beck manga series.

The game was showcased in playable form at the Square Enix Party 2005 in Japan.

Music 

The music of Heavy Metal Thunder was composed by various heavy metal bands and musicians, including Michael Schenker and ex-Megadeth guitarist Marty Friedman. The eponymous song "Heavy Metal Thunder" written by Sex Machineguns serves as the theme song of both the game and the Heavy Meta-san TV show. The soundtrack of the game was published in Japan by Toshiba EMI on September 7, 2005.

Reception 
The game sold 3,367 copies the week of its release. It received a score of 30 out of 40 by the Japanese gaming magazine Famitsu. American multimedia website IGN considered the gameplay simple, but praised the amount of animation used and called the theme song "catchy". American website GameSpot echoed the comments, stating that the game relies on its atmosphere and cut scenes more than gameplay. IGN noted that the game would appeal to fans of Heavy Meta-san and hard rock in general.

References

External links 
  
 Official page at Media. Vision 

2005 video games
Action video games
Japan-exclusive video games
Media.Vision games
PlayStation 2 games
PlayStation 2-only games
Square Enix games
Video games developed in Japan
Video games set in the 30th century
Single-player video games
Video games set in Japan
Video games scored by Kow Otani